The Maryland State Highway Administration (MDOT SHA or simply SHA) is the state transportation business unit responsible for maintaining Maryland's numbered highways outside Baltimore. Formed originally under authority of the General Assembly of Maryland in 1908 as the State Roads Commission (SRC), under the direction of the executive branch of state government headed by the governor of Maryland, it is tasked with maintaining non-tolled/free bridges throughout the state, removing snow from the state's major thoroughfares, administering the state's "adopt-a-highway" program, and both developing and maintaining the state's freeway/expressway system. Since the reorganization of the several commissions, bureaus, boards, and assorted minor agencies with departments of the executive branch and establishment of the governor's cabinet in the early 1970s following the adoption of several individual reorganization recommendations after the rejection by the voters in a November 1968 referendum of the 1968 proposed overall new state constitution prepared by the 1967–1968 Constitutional Convention. It is now a division of the larger establishment of the Maryland Department of Transportation and is currently overseen by an administrator.

MDOT SHA headquarters is located in the city of Baltimore and houses numerous divisions and offices, including:
Office of Planning and Preliminary Engineering
Office of Highway Development
Office of Structures
Office of Environmental Design
Office of Policy and Research
Office of Real Estate

MDOT SHA also maintains a complex in Hanover, which is home to: 
Office of Construction
Office of Traffic and Safety (OOTS), which includes the Traffic Engineering Design Division, which is responsible for the development of new traffic signals, signal modifications, upgrades, and signal phasing; the Signal Operations Section, which provides personnel and equipment for the maintenance and programming of signals along state roadways in every county except Montgomery County.; and the Sign Operations Section, which designs and fabricates signing for use throughout the entire state.
Office of Maintenance, which provides assistance with recurring maintenance tasks that require more intensive study—particularly roadway safety and resurfacing projects.
 Office of Transportation Mobility and Operations (OTMO), which uses intelligent transportation systems (ITSs) technologies, Advanced Traffic Management Systems (ATMSs), and partnerships to monitor traffic, clear incidents, assist stranded motorists on our highways, and provide real-time traveler information. Its units include:
The Statewide Operations Center is responsible for requesting incident response teams for incidents on state roadways. Responders may include police, fire, medical,  the Coordinated Highways Action Response Team (CHART), hazmat, the Maryland Emergency Management Agency (MEMA), environmental, or maintenance teams. This facility is also equipped to operate as a Statewide Transportation Emergency Operations Center.
Office of CHART, which provides incident response services throughout the state, though it only provides regular patrols on interstates and select major arterials.
The Office of Materials Technology (OMT) which consists of the Executive Services area and eight divisions: Field Explorations, Engineering Geology, Pavement and Geotechnical, Asphalt Technology, Concrete Technology, Soils and Aggregate Technology, Structural Materials and Pavement Markings, and Materials Management. All are crucial in the maintenance of current roadways as well as the development of new ones.

Districts

There are seven districts in the state. These districts at the least, have divisions for traffic, construction, maintenance, and utilities. Each district also oversees several maintenance shops—typically one per county. The following is a table of the districts, counties within their jurisdiction, and their respective headquarters.

See also

References

External links

MDOT SHA website(Mobile)
CHART website(Mobile)

Highway
Transportation in Maryland
1908 establishments in Maryland